East Hills,  a suburb of local government area City of Canterbury-Bankstown, is located 26 kilometres south-west of the Sydney central business district, in the state of New South Wales, Australia, and is a part of the South-western Sydney region, near larger areas like Liverpool, Revesby, and Bankstown.

East Hills is a small suburb on the northern bank of the Georges River.  The adjacent suburbs are Panania and Picnic Point. Nearby suburbs on the opposite bank of the Georges River include Pleasure Point, Voyager Point, Sandy Point and Hammondville.

History
East Hills was the name used to describe the whole area south of Bankstown to the Georges River and east to The River Road. George Johnstone (1790–1820) was granted  here in 1804 and called it New Jerusalem. It was west of The River Road between Bransgrove and Tomson Streets. Robert Gardiner a tenant on the property called his farm East Hills, possibly after the region of that name near Liverpool, England and since this area is close to another Liverpool. In 1828 Thomas Graham was granted , south of Johnston’s land, which he sold to Charles Tompson in 1835. The area to the west was bought by George Nicholas Weston in 1838.

In 1893, the area was subdivided and named East Hills after the farm. The railway line was opened in 1931 and East Hills was the terminating station. The line was originally single track from Riverwood railway station to East Hills. This line was extended in 1987 to a new station at Holsworthy and connected to the Main South Line at Glenfield and on to Campbelltown. This provided another link to the city from areas like Minto, Campbelltown and Glenfield.

Population
According to the 2016 census, there were 77,348 residents in East Hills. 63% of people were born in Australia. 53.6% of people spoke only English at home. Other languages spoken at home included Arabic 11.6% and Vietnamese 6.4%. The most common ancestries were Australian 18.5%, English 16.1%, Irish 5.6%, Chinese 7.1% and Lebanses 8.5%. The most common responses for religion were Catholic 27.8%, No Religion 16.4% and Anglican 12.2%.

Commercial area

A small group of shops is located in Maclaurin Avenue, beside East Hills railway station. The East Hills Hotel is also located here.

Transport
East Hills railway station is on the Airport & South Line of the Sydney Trains network. Parts of East Hills are serviced by buses operated by Transdev NSW, generally following the routes established by McVicar's Bus Services.

Schools
East Hills has two high schools and one primary school: East Hills Boys, East Hills Girls Technology High School and East Hills Primary School.

Sport
East Hills has a successful baseball club and the East Hills Bulldogs compete in the Canterbury-Bankstown District Junior Rugby League competition with Smith Park their home ground.

References

City of Canterbury-Bankstown
Suburbs of Sydney